The 1968–69 season of the European Cup football club tournament was won by Milan, who beat Ajax 4–1 in the final, giving Milan its first European Cup title since 1963, and its second overall. A number of Eastern Bloc clubs withdrew from the first two rounds when UEFA paired up all of the Eastern Bloc clubs against one another in the aftermath of the Soviet invasion of Czechoslovakia.

Substitutions of two players at any game time were allowed; obligatory match dates were introduced (two weeks between the legs) and fixed on Wednesdays; the away goal rule was extended to the first and second rounds.

Manchester United, the defending champions, were eliminated by Milan in the semi-finals.

Bracket

First round

 

|}

First leg

Second leg

Milan won 5–3 on aggregate.

Celtic won 4–2 on aggregate.

Manchester United won 10–2 on aggregate.

Anderlecht won 5–2 on aggregate.

Rapid Wien won 6–4 on aggregate.

Real Madrid won 12–0 on aggregate.

Ajax won 5–1 on aggregate.

Fenerbahçe won 2–1 on aggregate.

Benfica won 8–1 on aggregate.

Reipas Lahti won 3–1 on aggregate.

Spartak Trnava won 5–3 on aggregate.

AEK Athens won 5–3 on aggregate.

AB won 4–3 on aggregate.

Second round

|}

First leg

Second leg

Celtic won 6–2 on aggregate.

Manchester United won 4–3 on aggregate.

Rapid Wien won 2–2 on away goals.

Ajax won 4–0 on aggregate.

Spartak Trnava won 16–2 on aggregate.

AEK Athens won 2–0 on aggregate.

Quarter-finals

|}

1 Ajax beat Benfica 3–0 in a play-off.

First leg

Second leg

Milan won 1–0 on aggregate.

Manchester United won 3–0 on aggregate.

4–4 on aggregate. Tie is decided by a tie-breaker match on neutral ground.

Spartak Trnava won 3–2 on aggregate.

Tie-breakers

Ajax win the tie-breaker.

Semi-finals

|}

First leg

Second leg

Milan won 2–1 on aggregate.

Ajax won 3–2 on aggregate.

Final

Top scorers
The top scorers from the 1968–69 European Cup are as follows:

References

External links
1968–69 All matches – season at UEFA website
European Cup results at Rec.Sport.Soccer Statistics Foundation
 All scorers 1968–69 European Cup according to protocols UEFA
1968-69 European Cup – results and line-ups (archive)

1968–69 in European football
European Champion Clubs' Cup seasons